The Willard Covered Bridge is a historic covered bridge carrying Mill Street across the Ottauquechee River in Hartland, Vermont.  It is the eastern of two covered bridges on the road, which are connected via a small island in the river; the western bridge was built in 2001.  This bridge, built about 1870, was listed on the National Register of Historic Places in 1973.

Description and history
The Willard Covered Bridge is located in the village of North Hartland, where Mill Street runs roughly eastward, crossing the Ottauquechee River to provide access to a few homes and businesses. The road crosses the river at a point south of Interstate 91 (I-91) where it is briefly bisected by a small island. The western of the bridges carrying the road is a modern covered bridge, while the Willard Bridge is to the east. It is a single-span Town lattice truss  in length, resting on stone abutments faced in concrete. The gable ends project beyond the trusses, and the roof is a standing seam metal roof. The bridge sides and portals are sheathed in vertical board siding; there are two square openings cut into each side.

The bridge was built about 1870; it is one of two surviving 19th-century covered bridges in Hartland.  (The other is the Martin's Mill Covered Bridge, also listed on the National Register.)

See also
 
 
 
 National Register of Historic Places listings in Windsor County, Vermont
 List of Vermont covered bridges
 List of bridges on the National Register of Historic Places in Vermont

References

Covered bridges on the National Register of Historic Places in Vermont
National Register of Historic Places in Windsor County, Vermont
Covered bridges in Windsor County, Vermont
Buildings and structures in Hartland, Vermont
Wooden bridges in Vermont
Road bridges on the National Register of Historic Places in Vermont
Lattice truss bridges in the United States